A batten is a piece of construction material.

Batten may also refer to:

 Batten (surname), for people named Batten
 Batten (car), a British automobile produced in the 1930s
 Batten (theater), a horizontal pole from which lights, props or curtains may be hung
 Batten disease, a disorder of the nervous system
 Batten Kill, an American river that rises in Vermont and flows into New York
 Batten Kill Railroad, a class III railroad operating in New York
 Mount Batten, an outcrop of rock at Plymouth Sound in England
 Sail batten, a flexible insert in a sail to help shape it as an airfoil
 BBDO (Batten, Barton, Durstine & Osborn), an American advertising agency

See also

Baton (disambiguation)
 
 Battenberg (disambiguation)
 Mountbatten (disambiguation)